Run for Your Life is an album by the American jazz group Yellowjackets, released in 1994. The album reached a peak position of number eight on Billboard Top Contemporary Jazz Albums chart. It was nominated for a Grammy Award, in the "Best Contemporary Jazz Performance" category.

Critical reception

The Globe and Mail opined that "only tenor saxophonist Bon Mintzer's 'The Red Sea' is particularly memorable." The Charlotte Observer called Run for Your Life "the best jazz album of the year," writing that it "is a collection of nine simply superior jazz cuts, each showing off the band's precision and ability."

Track listing

Personnel 
Yellowjackets
 Russell Ferrante – keyboards
 Jimmy Haslip – bass, vocals 
 Will Kennedy – drums
 Bob Mintzer – soprano saxophone, tenor saxophone, bass clarinet, EWI

Additional musicians
 Steve Croes – Synclavier
 Judd Miller – synthesizer programming
 Robben Ford – guitars

Production 
 Yellowjackets – producers
 Mick Guzauski – recording engineer 
 James Farber – recording engineer, mixing 
 Richard Landers – assistant engineer
 Gil Morales – assistant engineer
 Chad Blinman – mix assistant 
 Joseph Doughney – post-production engineer
 Michael Landy – post-production engineer
 Kevin Gray – mastering 
 Sally G. Poppe – production coordinator 
 Margi Denton – design 
 Tim Lewis – illustration 
 Philip Avery Noble – photography

Studios
 Recorded at O'Henry Sound Studios (Burbank, CA) and The Complex (Los Angeles, CA).
 Mixed at The Complex
 Mastered at Location Recording Service (Burbank, CA).
 Post-Production at The Review Room (New York, NY).

Charts

References

Yellowjackets albums
1994 albums
GRP Records albums
Instrumental albums